Sisters is a city in Deschutes County, Oregon, United States. It is part of the Bend, Oregon Metropolitan Statistical Area. The population was 2,038 at the 2010 census.

History 
The community takes its name from the nearby Three Sisters mountains.

Geography

The Santiam Highway (U.S. Route 20) and the McKenzie Highway (Oregon Route 126) merge briefly to form Cascade Avenue, the main thoroughfare through downtown Sisters. On Cascade Avenue, there is a lot of pedestrian traffic and many specialty stores and galleries. East of Sisters the two highways split, with 126 heading to Redmond and 20 going to Bend. West of Sisters, the road splits once more, with the McKenzie Highway becoming Oregon Route 242 and running west over the McKenzie Pass (a summertime-only scenic route over the Cascades.) The Santiam Highway proceeds over the Santiam Pass.

Climate

This region experiences warm (but not hot) and dry summers, with no average monthly temperatures above .  According to the Köppen Climate Classification system, Sisters has a warm-summer Mediterranean climate, abbreviated "Csb" on climate maps.

Demographics

2010 census
As of the census of 2010, there were 2,038 people, 847 households, and 557 families residing in the city. The racial makeup of the city was 93.9% White, 1.1% Native American, 0.7% Asian, 2.3% from other races, and 2.1% from two or more races. Hispanic or Latino of any race were 7.1% of the population.

There were 847 households, of which 32.3% had children under the age of 18 living with them, 48.1% were married couples living together, 13.7% had a female householder with no husband present, 4.0% had a male householder with no wife present, and 34.2% were non-families. 29.0% of all households were made up of individuals, and 12.2% had someone living alone who was 65 years of age or older. The average household size was 2.39 and the average family size was 2.92.

The median age in the city was 41.4 years. 26.3% of residents were under the age of 18; 6.5% were between the ages of 18 and 24; 21.9% were from 25 to 44; 30.4% were from 45 to 64; and 14.9% were 65 years of age or older. The gender makeup of the city was 48.1% male and 51.9% female.

2000 census
As of the census of 2000, there were 959 people, 397 households, and 262 families residing in the city. The population density was 663.0 people per square mile (255.4/km). There were 482 housing units at an average density of 333.2 per square mile (128.3/km). The racial makeup of the city was 95.83% White, 1.56% Native American, 0.42% Asian, 1.36% from other races, and 0.83% from two or more races. Hispanic or Latino of any race were 4.59% of the population.

There were 397 households, out of which 33.0% had children under the age of 18 living with them, 49.6% were married couples living together, 11.8% had a female householder with no husband present, and 33.8% were non-families. 25.2% of all households were made up of individuals, and 8.8% had someone living alone who was 65 years of age or older. The average household size was 2.41 and the average family size was 2.88.

In the city, the population was spread out, with 26.1% under the age of 18, 9.0% from 18 to 24, 26.1% from 25 to 44, 25.0% from 45 to 64, and 13.9% who were 65 years of age or older. The median age was 39 years. For every 100 females, there were 98.1 males. For every 100 females age 18 and over, there were 103.7 males.

The median income for a household in the city was $35,000, and the median income for a family was $43,977. Males had a median income of $35,563 versus $21,771 for females. The per capita income for the city was $17,847. About 7.4% of families and 10.4% of the population were below the poverty line, including 2.3% of those under age 18 and 10.7% of those age 65 or over.

Education
The Sisters area is served by Sisters School District, which is responsible for the education of approximately 1,300 students at four schools:
 Sisters Elementary School - Kindergarten through Grade 4
 Sisters Middle School - Grades 5 through 8
 Sisters High School - Grades 9 through 12
 Sisters High School Alternative Programs - Grades 9 through 12

Sisters is also home to Sisters Christian Academy, a non-denominational Christian school.

Media
The local newspaper is The Nugget Newspaper published weekly on Wednesdays. The Small Farmer's Journal also originates in Sisters.

Events

 The Sisters Rodeo is held the second weekend in June, held since 1941.
 Sisters Outdoor Quilt Show is on the second weekend of July.
 The Sisters Glory Daze Car Show is held in mid July
 Sisters Folk Festival is held the weekend after Labor Day in September.
 Fourth Friday Artwalk is a monthly event, occurring all year.
 Artists Studio Tour is held on the last weekend in September.

Recreation 

Sisters is the headquarters of the Sisters District of the Deschutes National Forest. The Sisters Ranger District Office is located at Pine Street and Highway 20. Hiking, biking and horse riding trails go from the city limits into the Three Sisters Wilderness. Sisters Trail Alliance builds and maintains hiking, biking and equestrian trails near the city.

The Sisters area is also home to several mountain biking trails, including the Peterson Ridge Trail and Suttle Lake trails.

Hoodoo ski resort and many snow parks are nearby.

Camp Tamarack is nearby. as is Big Lake Youth Camp operated by Seventh-day Adventists since 1963.

Transportation
 Oregon Route 126
 Oregon Route 242
 U.S. Route 20
 Sisters Eagle Air Airport

Notable people
 Dan Fouts, former professional football player
 Chris Klug, Olympic snowboarder
 Ken Ruettgers, former professional football player
 Tonya Harding, former professional and Olympic skater
 Rainn Wilson, actor known for The Office
 Johnny Werhas, former professional baseball player

References

External links

 
 City of Sisters (official website)
 Entry for Sisters in the Oregon Blue Book
 Sisters Chamber of Commerce

 
Cities in Oregon
Cities in Deschutes County, Oregon
American frontier
1888 establishments in Oregon
Populated places established in 1888